The 1996 Rhein Fire season was the second season for the franchise in the World League of American Football (WLAF). The team was led by head coach Galen Hall in his second year, and played its home games at Rheinstadion in Düsseldorf, Germany. They finished the regular season in sixth place with a record of three wins and seven losses.

Offseason

World League draft

Personnel

Staff

Roster

Schedule

Standings

Game summaries

Week 1: vs Frankfurt Galaxy

Week 2: at Amsterdam Admirals

Week 3: vs London Monarchs

Week 4: vs Scottish Claymores

Week 5: at Barcelona Dragons

Week 6: at Scottish Claymores

Week 7: vs Barcelona Dragons

Week 8: at Frankfurt Galaxy

Week 9: vs Amsterdam Admirals

Week 10: at London Monarchs

Statistics

Team statistics

Notes

References

Rhein Fire seasons
Rhein
Rhein